Social disruption is a term used in sociology to describe the alteration, dysfunction or breakdown of social life, often in a community setting. Social disruption implies a  radical transformation, in which the old certainties of modern society are falling away and something quite new is emerging. Social disruption might be caused through natural disasters, massive human displacements, rapid economic, technological and demographic change but also due to controversial policy-making.

Social disruptions are for example rising sea levels that are creating new landscapes, drawing new world maps whose key lines are not traditional boundaries between nation-states but elevations above sea level. On the local level, an example would be the closing of a community grocery store, which might cause social disruption in a community by removing a "meeting ground" for community members to develop interpersonal relationships and community solidarity.

Results of social disruption 
"We are wandering aimlessly and dispassionately, arguing for and against, but the one statement on which we are, beyond all differences and over many continents, to be able to agree on, is: "I can no longer understand the world".

Social disruptions often lead to five social symptoms: Frustration, Democratic Disconnection, Fragmentation, Polarization and Escalation. Studies from the last decade show, that our societies have become more fragmented and less coherent (e.g. Bishop 2008), neighbourhoods turning into little states, organizing themselves to defend the local politics and culture against outsiders (Walzer 1983; Bauman 2017) and increasingly identifying through ways of voting, lifestyle or wellbeing (e.g. Schäfer 2015). Especially people on the more right and left political spectrum are more likely to say it is important to them to live in a place where most people share their political views and have similar interests (Pew 2014). Hence, citizens become alienated from democratic consensus (Foa and Munk 2016; Levitsky and Ziblatt 2018) and tend to assume that their opponents believe more extreme things than they really do (Iyengar et al. 2012). Moreover, fear of being identified as unqualified, denied value and dignity and for that reason marginalized, excluded or outcast, is giving rise to a widespread disenchantment with the idea that the future will improve the human condition and a mistrust in the ability of nation-states to make this happen (Pew 2015; Bauman 2017). At the same time, accelerations in liberal progression, globalization and migration flows have led to increasing polarized contestations about national identities - a volatile and critical social state, prone to conflict escalation (e.g. hate crimes after Brexit vote, incident at far-right rally in Charlottesville, USA).

Policy making 
"It is unclear how to achieve policy changes of any kind in a polarized society that has few shared facts and whose civic muscles are atrophying." 

International but also local challenges force our societies to find solutions and make decisions on controversial issues in an accelerated manner. The complexity of such decisions is not only mirrored in the aim to tackle a multi-causality of root causes, it also faces a high degree of uncertainty as regard to its impact. Hence, due to the growing separation between the world of public opinion on the one hand, and the world of problem solving on the other (Mair 2009), it is very likely that political decisions further polarize our societies. The explanation is that citizens evaluate disruptive developments and related policy changes on a two-way level, on the personal interests and comfort, as well on its perceived impact on their social identity and community (Ryan and Deci 2000; Haidt 2012). If a policy change reflects the substantive representation of the median voter, is something that just does not matter to citizens in regard to their acceptance of decisions (Esaiasson et al. 2017). This can produce multi facet conflicts over interests, facts and norms between supporters and opponents (Itten 2017). Simultaneously, the capacity of political parties and actors of civil society, to bridge that divide, is declining (Mair 2009). In such a situations, social psychology tells us that citizens who feel uncomfortable will hold tighter to the assumptions that make them feel secure (Podziba 2014). Especially in public policy disputes, parties are hardly giving up their assumptions voluntarily, and citizens begin to masquerade their true individual conflict of interest (e.g. devaluation of property; insecurity) with more normative conflict of interest (e.g. protection of nature; protection of culture). Such distorted behaviour remarkably increases at times citizens or communities feel that a policy change is threatening their way of living.

Bridging social capital 
In the light of the increasing social divisions and democratic disconnection, Putnam and Feldstein (2004) foresaw the importance of creating “bridging social capital”, e.g. ties that link groups across a greater social distance. As the authors elaborate, the creation of robust social capital takes time and effort. It develops largely through extensive and time-consuming face-to-face conversation between two individuals or small groups of people. Only then there is the chance to build the trust and mutual understanding that characterizes the foundation of social capital. In no way, Putnam and Feldstein write, it is possible to create social capital instantaneous, anonymous or en masse. Furthermore, building social capital among people who already share a reservoir of similar cultural referents, ethnicity, personal experience or moral identity etc. is qualitatively different. Homogeneity makes connective strategies easier, however, a society with only homogeneous social capital risks looking like Bosnia or Belfast. Hence, bridging social capital is especially important for reconciling democracy and diversity. Yet, bridging social capital among diverse social group is intrinsically less likely to develop automatically.

See also
Sociology:
 Boomtown
 Gillette Syndrome
 Social problem
 Social capital
 Social transformation

Organisations:

 Civil Politics
 Disrupted Societies Institute

References

 Bauman, Z. (2017). Symptoms in search for an object and a name, in Geiselberger, H. (Ed.) (2017). The Great Regression. Cambridge: Polity Press, 13-26.
 Beck, Ulrich (2017). The Metamorphosis of the World. Polity Press.
 Bishop, B. (2008). The big sort: Why the clustering of like-minded America is tearing us apart. Houghton Mifflin Harcourt.
 Esaiasson, P., Gilljam, M., and Persson, M. (2017): Responsiveness Beyond Policy Satisfaction: Does It Matter to Citizens? Comparative Political Studies 50(6): 739-765.
 Foa, R. S. and Mounk, Y. (2016). The democratic disconnect. Journal of Democracy, 27(3): 5-17.
 Haidt, J. (2012). The righteous mind: Why good people are divided by politics and religion. New York: Vintage.
 Itten, A. (2017). Context and Content toward Consensus in Public Mediation. Negotiation Journal, 33(3): 185-211.
 Iyengar, S., Sood, G., and Lelkes, Y. (2012). Affect, Not Ideology. A Social Identity Perspective on Polarization. Public opinion quarterly, 76(3): 405-431.
 Krannich, Richard S, and Thomas Greider. 1984. "Personal Well-Being in Rapid Growth and Stable Communities: Multiple Indicators and Contrasting Results." Rural Sociology 49(4): 541–552.
 Levitsky, S. and Ziblatt, D. (2018). How Democracies Die. Crown.
 Mair, P. (2009). Representative versus Responsible Government. MPIfG Working Paper 09/8.
 Pew Research Center (2014). Political Polarization in the American Public. June, 12.
 Pew Research Center (2015). Beyond Distrust: How Americans View Their Government. November, 23
 Podziba, S. L. (2014). Civic fusion: Moving from certainty through not knowing to curiosity. Negotiation Journal, 30(3): 243-254.
 Putnam, R. D. and Feldstein, L. (2004). Better together: Restoring the American community. New York: Simon and Schuster.
 Ryan, R. M., and Deci, E. L. (2000). Self-determination theory and the facilitation of intrinsic motivation, social development, and well-being. American psychologist, 55(1): 68-92.
 Schäfer, A. (2015). Demokratie? Mehr oder weniger, in Frankfurter Allgemeinen Zeitung, 9.11.2015.
 Walzer, M. (1983). Spheres of justice: A defense of pluralism and equality. New York: Basic books.
 W. David Pierce and Carl D. Cheney, Behavior Analysis and Learning 3rd ED

Behaviorism